Haripaladeva was the Shilahara  ruler of the north Konkan branch from 1148 CE – 1155 CE.

Aparaditya was followed by Haripaladeva, several of whose inscriptions ranging in dates from Shaka 1070 to Shaka 1076 have been discovered in Thane  district. (Dept. Gazetteer: 2002)

See also
 Shilahara

References
 Bhandarkar R.G. (1957): Early History of Deccan, Sushil Gupta (I) Pvt Ltd, Calcutta.
 Fleet, J.F. (1896): "The Dynasties of the Kanarese District of The Bombay Presidency", written for The Bombay Gazetteer.
 Department of Gazetteer, Govt of Maharashtra (2002): Itihaas : Prachin Kal, Khand -1 (Marathi)
 Department of Gazetteer, Govt of Maharashtra (1960): Kolhapur District Gazetteer
 Department of Gazetteer, Govt of Maharashtra (1964): Kolaba District Gazetteer
 Department of Gazetteer, Govt of Maharashtra (1982): Thane District Gazetteer
 A.S. Altekar (1936): The Silaharas of Western India.

External links
 Silver Coin of Shilaharas of Southern Maharashtra (Coinex 2006 - Souvenir)

12th-century rulers in Asia
Shilahara dynasty